The name Nangka has been used to name four tropical cyclones in the northwestern Pacific Ocean. The name is a jackfruit and was submitted by Malaysia.

 Severe Tropical Storm Nangka (2003) (T0305, 06W, Dodong), tracked well east of Japan.
 Tropical Storm Nangka (2009) (T0904, 04W, Feria), traversed the Philippines and then made its final landfall in Guangdong, China.
 Typhoon Nangka (2015) (T1511, 11W), a powerful Category 4 super typhoon that affected the Mariana Islands.
 Tropical Storm Nangka (2020) (T2016, 18W, Nika), made landfall in Hainan, China, and in Ninh Bình, Vietnam.

Pacific typhoon set index articles